Karl-Arnold Jalakas (10 February 1901 Tallinn – 3 August 1942 Sverdlovsk) was an Estonian politician. He was a member of VI Riigikogu (its Chamber of Deputies).

References

1901 births
1942 deaths
Politicians from Tallinn
People from Kreis Harrien
Members of the Vaps Movement
Members of the Riigivolikogu
University of Tartu alumni
Estonian military personnel of the Estonian War of Independence
Estonian people executed by the Soviet Union